The Central Murray Football Netball League (CMFNL) is a major country Australian rules football and netball competition based in northern Victoria and southwest New South Wales in Australia.

History
The league was formed in 1997, combining all eight teams from the existing Mid Murray Football League, and three sides from the Northern and Echuca Football League. Leitchville-Gunbower joined the league in 2002, while Tooleybuc merged with former Mallee Football League club Manangatang in 2004.

Leitchville-Gunbower moved to the Heathcote District Football League in 2010.

Current Clubs

Notes

Recent Premierships

1996  Lalbert
1997  Tyntynder 
1998  Tyntynder 
1999  Tyntynder  
2000  Nyah-Nyah West United  
2001  Nyah-Nyah West United 
2002  Woorinen 
2003  Lake Boga 
2004  Kerang

2005  Swan Hill 
2006  Balranald 
2007  Tooleybuc-Manangatang 
2008  Swan Hill
2009  Balranald
2010  Kerang
2011  Swan Hill
2012  Kerang
2013  Kerang

2014  Kerang
2015  Kerang
2016  Kerang
2017  Kerang
2018  Woorinen
2019  Woorinen
2020 League in recess due to COVID19 pandemic 
2021  Cohuna (No Finals System due to COVID19 Pandemic)
2022  Kerang

2011 Ladder

2012 Ladder

2013 Ladder

2014 Ladder

2015 Ladder

2016 Ladder

2017 Ladder

2018 Ladder

2019 Ladder

2021 Ladder

References

External links
 
 Central Murray at Full Points Footy 

 
Australian rules football competitions in New South Wales
Australian rules football competitions in Victoria (Australia)
1997 establishments in Australia
Netball leagues in New South Wales
Netball leagues in Victoria (Australia)